The 1975 Buffalo Bills season was the franchise's 6th season in the National Football League, and the 16th overall. The Bills failed to improve on their 9–5 record from last year and finished 8–6. They enjoyed their third consecutive winning season, but they still failed to qualify for the playoffs for the first time since 1973.

Season summary
The Bills led the league in points scored, with 420 (30.0 per game). This amount is the most points scored by any team in a 14-game season after the merger, and the most points scored by any team in the 1970s. The Bills were the only team in NFL history to average at least 30 points per game and miss the playoffs, until being joined by the Kansas City Chiefs in 2004.

Buffalo won their first four games by an average of 17 points. They were 5–2 at the halfway point of the season, and one game behind the 6–1 Miami Dolphins in the AFC East. Buffalo then lost four of their final seven games, ultimately falling two games short of the division title.

Bills' running back O. J. Simpson rushed for 1817 yards on the season, and set a then-record with 23 touchdowns scored for the season. Fullback Jim Braxton had 823 yards rushing. Buffalo's ground game dominated the league, with a total of 2974 rushing yards, over 300 yards more than the second best rushing total.

The 1975 Bills have the distinction of giving up the most total passing yards (3,080) in a 14-game schedule during the merger era. However, the Bills' 45 takeaways on defense led the league in 1975.  Defensive back Robert James and safety Doug Jones were lost to the season with knee injuries.

Offseason

NFL draft

Buffalo's defense gave up the fourth-most yards in the NFL in 1974, and so the Bills' first two picks in the 1975 draft were a pair of Nebraska linebackers – Tom Ruud and Bob Nelson—both of whom played for Buffalo for three seasons. N.C. State running back Roland Hooks played in every Bills game from 1976–1981. He is best known for his "Hail Mary" reception against New England in Week Twelve of the 1981 season, a catch which was instrumental in putting Buffalo into the postseason that year.

Personnel

Staff/coaches

Final roster

Regular season

Schedule

Note: Intra-division opponents are in bold text.

Season summary

Week 1 vs Jets

Week 2 at Steelers

Week 3 vs Broncos

Week 4 at Colts

Week 5 vs Giants

Week 6 vs Dolphins

Week 7 at Jets

Week 8 vs Colts

Week 9 at Bengals

MNF

Week 10 vs Patriots

Week 11 at Cardinals

Thursday game

Week 12 at Dolphins

Week 13 at Patriots

Week 14 vs Vikings

Saturday game
Snow

Standings

Awards and honors

All-Pros

First Team
Joe DeLamielleure, Guard
O. J. Simpson, Running back

Second Team
Reggie McKenzie, Guard

See also
Electric Company

References

 Bills on Pro Football Reference
 Bills on jt-sw.com
 Bills Stats on jt-sw.com

Buffalo Bills seasons
Buffalo Bills
Buffalo